Davud Ghaffarzadegan is an Iranian author and novelist. His war novel, Fortune Told in Blood, has been translated into English. He has written more than two decades for people of all ages.

Personal life
Ghaffarzadegan was born in Ardebil on October 2, 1959, and finished his studies at Ardebil Elementary Teacher's College in 1977. He worked as a teacher and taught in the villages of Ardabil. His first work was published in 1980. He moved to Tehran in 1988 and worked in an educational publishing office. He is now retired and lives in Tehran.

Bibliography
Ghaffarzadegan has written stories on various topics for a diverse audience over two decades. He was awarded The 20 Years Literature Story Award based on his work "We're three". His novel, Fortune Told in Blood was  published by the University of Texas America. This book won an award at the A Quarter Century of Sacred Defense Books festival in the novel category.

Children and adolescents

 Little pilot\Khalaban Koochooloo\ Children's story
 Sang Andazan-e Ghar-e Kabood\ Adolescent's novel
 Midnight singing\Avaz-e Nime Shab\ Adolescent's novel
 Flying cranes\Parvaz-e Dornaha\ Adolescent's novel
 Eight old heroes and seven young men\ Hasht Pahlavan-e Pir Haft Pesar-e Javan\ Adolescent's story
 Winter on the way\Zemestan dar raah
 Pigeons and daggers\Kabutar haa va khanjar haa
 Uninvited guests\Mehmaane nakhande
 Good and bad\Khubo bad
 Blue whale tale\Gheseye nahanghaa
 Stone monster\Ghule sangi
 A story of an unfinished painting/Gheseye naghashie naa tamaam
 A flower for the green stem\Goli baraye sagheye sabz
 Palm trees and spears\Nakhlaa va neyzehaa
 Pigeon are born in the crate\Kabutar haa dar ghafas be donya miayand

 Lost snowman\Adam barfie gom shode
 Yek matal, se afsane
 Blue crow/Kalaghe aabi
 Curly hair/Moo ferferi
 Crows also die/kalagh haa ham mimirand
 Centipede/Hezar paa
 Why is rooster tail short?/Chera dome khorus kutah ast
 Red flower and the plant/gole sorkh va giahe baadgard
 Mad hero/Pahlevan divane sar

Adults

 Fortune told in blood\Fal-e Khoon\ Novel\ translated into English in 2008 under the title Fortune Told in Blood

 Ayub at night\Shab-e Ayyub\ Long story
 Shadows and the long night\Sayeha va Shab-e Deraz\ Long story
 We are three\Ma Se Nafar Hastim\ Collected stories
 The mystery of Mr. Mir's death/Raz-e Ghatl-e Agha Mir\Collected stories
 Frightened girls/Dokhtaran-e Delriz\ Collected stories
 An unnamed confession book/Ketab-e Bi Nam-e Eterafat\ Novel
 Standing under high voltage power lines/Istadan Zir-e Dakal-e Bargh-e Feshar-e Ghavi\ Collected stories
 Havayi digar
 Derakhte jaru
 Ta az sokjhan door nayoftim
 Nightmare House/Kabuskhaneh
 A man that God wanted him dead/Mardi ke khoda dustdasht oo ra koshte bebinad

References

Iranian male novelists
Iranian novelists
Iranian male short story writers
People from Tehran
1959 births
Living people